Laurie Allen may refer to:

Laurie Allen of Bobby & Laurie, Australian singer, and of the Laurie Allen Revue
Laurie Allen (curler), Canadian curler
Laurie Allen (judge), Canadian judge

See also
Laurie Allan (born 1943), English drummer
Laurie Allyn, American jazz singer
Lawrence Allen (disambiguation)
Laurence Allen (disambiguation)